The Awash multimammate mouse or Awash mastomys (Mastomys awashensis) is a species of rodent in the family Muridae found only in Ethiopia. Phylogentically the Awash multimammate mouse is the sister taxon of the Natal multimammate mouse (M. natalensis), a species found almost everywhere in Africa south of the Sahara and considered a serious agricultural pest throughout its range.

Habitat
Its natural habitats are dry savanna and arable land.
It is threatened by habitat loss. It is also considered as a pest for grain crops.

Ecology
The species' ecology has been studied in detail in the croplands of the Degua Tembien district in Tigray, where it commonly occurs in crop fields, domestic and peri-domestic habitats in wider altitudinal range (1500 m up to 2700 m). Being a nocturnal and burrowing species, it prefers crop fields with vertisols. Likewise, the multimammate mouse possibly contributes to a significant portion to the rodent diet of night-active raptors such as Barn owl.

References

Endemic fauna of Ethiopia
Mastomys
Mammals of Ethiopia
Mammals described in 1998
Rodents of Africa
Taxonomy articles created by Polbot